Bajo sexto (Spanish: "sixth bass") is a Mexican string instrument from the guitar family with 12 strings in six double courses. A closely related instrument is the bajo quinto (Spanish: "fifth bass") which has 10 strings in five double courses.

In playing, the left hand holds the strings against frets on a fingerboard, while the right hand plucks or strums the strings. When played in older styles of music where the instrument assumes the role of a bass, the strings are usually plucked with the fingers. In modern chordal and melodic styles, a pick is frequently used.

Origins and use
The history of the bajo sexto is somewhat unclear. There are few written sources, and until very recently most music dictionaries and encyclopedias did not mention the instrument. A few contemporary researchers have been working from oral sources—living players and luthiers—to tracing the background of the instrument. They descend from the Spanish bandurrias and lutes that used double strings and were also tuned in fifths, perhaps to complete the harmonies in ensembles that required an instrument capable of giving the low notes of the harmonization of a melody. .

In the 17th and 18th centuries, Mexican artisans built several types of instruments with double strings in three, four, five, six, seven and eight courses, influenced by their Spanish ancestors. Descendants of these instruments are bandolon, guitarra séptima, quinta huapanguera, jarana jarocha, concheras, and guitarra chamula, among others.

The manufacture of bajo quinto and sexto reached a peak in quality and popularity in the 19th century in central and southern Mexico, in the states of Guerrero, Michoacán, Morelos, Puebla, Oaxaca, and Tlaxcala.

Near the end of the 19th century the bajo sexto began to migrate northwards, where it became a popular instrument for weddings and dances such as the bailes de regalos (popular between 1870 and 1930). In these settings, it was usually played along with a set of small tom-tom drums.

The 1930s saw the rise of conjunto music and the instruments of choice for this developing style were accordion and bajo sexto. At this time the bajo sexto functioned primarily as a bass instrument, providing a strong rhythmic foundation supporting the solo accordion. In the late 1940s, string bass (and later, electric bass) was added to the instruments, and in the 1950s, drums, completing the modern conjunto ensemble. The inclusion of bass and drums freed the bajo sexto from exclusively rhythmic bass duties, and bajo players began experimenting with chords, counter rhythms, and melodic lines.

As the popularity of conjunto spread northward, the bajo sexto went with it, and the instrument was taken up by musicians in Northern Mexico and Texas to play other forms of music: norteño music of Northern Mexico and across the border in the music of South Texas known as "Tejano" (or Tex-Mex), "conjunto", or "música mexicana-tejana".

Construction and tuning

The bajo sexto is a member of the guitar family, and physically looks like a cross between a 12-string guitar and a cello because of its size. However, there are important differences: The body is usually a bit deeper; the neck is shorter, joining the body at the 12th fret (modern 12-string guitars usually join at the 14th fret); and (being a bass instrument) the strings are thicker. Older instruments tended to have a larger body; modern instruments are more guitar-like, and the body is typically not more than an inch or so deeper than the guitar. Modern instruments frequently have a cutaway in the upper bout of the body adjacent to the neck, allowing easier access to higher playing positions on the neck, for the left hand.

Since the instrument is tuned an octave below the guitar, the body on some instruments is not large enough for the lowest E to resonate well, and many players remove the sixth course, playing on only 10 strings (five courses). Luthiers eventually picked up on this practice and began leaving off the low E course during construction, producing instruments with only five courses — bajo quintos.

Bajo sextos are traditionally tuned in fourths, what a guitarist would call all fourths tuning. The lower three courses are doubled at the higher octave (similar to the lower four courses on a 12-string guitar), and the upper three courses are doubled at the unison:

E1-E2    A1-A2    D2-D3    G2-G2    C3-C3    F3-F3    (from lowest to highest course)

The bajo quinto derives from the bajo sexto. Bajo quintos eliminate the low E course and are tuned as follows:

A2-A1    D3-D2    G2-G2    C3-C3    F3-F3    (from lowest to highest course, notwithstanding the first two pairs listed here as "highest to lowest".)

Notable players

 Max Baca (Los Texmaniacs)
 Eloy Bernal (Paulino Bernal)
 Ry Cooder
 Gustavo Cota (Los Tiranos del Norte) [First to use the double-cutaway body design]
 José Guadalupe Degollado (Grupo Control)
 Homero Guerrero
 Jose Elizondo (Grupo Pesado)
 Lorenzo (Lencho) Fraire (Gerardo Ortiz)
 Rubén Garza (Los Dos Gilbertos)
 Epifanio "Epi" Martínez Jr. (Epi and Friends)
 Juan P. Moreno 
 Rolando Pérez (Conjunto Primavera)
 Mario Quintero (Los Tucanes de Tijuana)
 Cornelio Reyna (Los Relampagos del Norte)
 Eliseo Robles (Ramón Ayala y sus Bravos del Norte)
 Salomón Robles
 Lesli Rodríguez (Las Fénix)
 Richard Rosales (Grupo Siggno)
 Johnny Lee Rosas (Intocable, Masizzo)
 Danny Sánchez (Grupo Intocable
 Oscar Tellez
 Tony Saenz( Tony Saenz Y La Rosa De Oro)
 Óscar Iván Treviño (Grupo Duelo) 
 Stevie Ray Vavages
 Doug Sahm
 Tony Aguilar (Grupo Desvelado)

References

External links
Bajo quinto in traditional southern Mexican music
Bajo sexto in action ( Video )

Guitar family instruments
Mexican musical instruments